This list comprises all players who have participated in at least one league match for Bakersfield Brigade from the team's first season in the USL Premier Development League in 2005 until its last in 2009. Players who were on the roster but never played a first team game are not listed; players who appeared for the team in other competitions (US Open Cup, etc.) but never actually made an USL appearance are noted at the bottom of the page where appropriate.

A
  Omar Abdulshife
  Carlos Aguilar
  Santiago Aguilera Navarro
  Ferguson Agwu
  Frank Alesci
  Quincy Amarikwa
  Mike R Anderson
  Esteban Arias
  Adan Arteaga
  Jason Ashurst

B
  Javier Barba
  Adam Beach
  Chad Borak
  Desmond Brooks
  Timothy Brown
  Efrain Burgos, Jr.

C
  John Carson
  Salvador Cervantes
  Daniel Chilton
  Victor Chinchilla
  Israel Cisneros
  Michael Clegg
  Todd Combs
  Andrew Coombs
  Rene Corona
  Dan Cumming
  Stephen Cunningham
  Gregory Curry
  Jonathan Curry

D
  Devin Deldo
  Jason Doss-Carter

E
  Brian Eisenbraun
  Miguel Esparza

F
  Wes Feighner
  Carlos Fernandez
  Mario Fernandez
  Eric Flores
  Andrew Forbes
  Mark Foster
  Eric Franco
  Rufino Franco
  Andrew Friel

G
  Michael Galland
  Kevin Gallaugher
  Alexis Gallice
  Alvaro Garcia
  Giovanni Garcia
  Jose Garcia
  Ryan Gay
  Francisco Gomez
  Moi Gomez
  Kyle Gookins
  Jay Gore
  Marcus Griffin
  Manny Guzman

H
  Jimmy Hall
  Derek Hanks
  Jacob Harris
  Brandon Hearron
  Juan Hernandez
  Kyle Holland
  Derrek Horn
  Jacob Hustedt

J
  Arturo Jauregui-Villegas
  Michael Jordan

K
  Andrew Kelley
  Greg Knittel

L
  Vincent Licciardi
  Jonah Long
  Aron Lopez
  Humberto Lopez

M
  Towa Manda
  Stephen Marshall
  Lyle Martin
  Mohammed Mashriqi
  Edgar Montero-Esquivel
  Thomas Montgomery
  Heber Mora
  Leonardo Munoz

N
  Tino Nuñez

O
  Armando Ochoa
  Jose Orneias
  Mario Ornelas
  Matthew O'Sullivan

P
  Nicolas Perera
  Angel Perez
  Salvador Pinto-Barbosa
  Andrew Proctor
  Marco Pulido

R
  Hiram Rangel
  Jean Carlos Reyes
  Kyle Reynish
  Rolando Rodriguez

S
  Kevin Saiki
  Nicholas Saire
  Edgar Saldana
  Fabian Sandoval
  Jason Santos
  Ryan Schmitz
  Jamie Scope
  Leon Sharf
  Shawn Singh
  Erasmo Solórzano
  Johnathon Solórzano
  Craig Stant
  Barry Steele

T
  Ken Taylor
  Brennan Tennelle
  Jordan Thorn
  Arturo Torres
  Steven Trojanowski

W
  Brian Walker
  Cameron Walters
  Ryan Williams
  Eric Wynalda

Z
  Juan Zabal

Sources

Bakersfield Brigade
 
Association football player non-biographical articles